Ray Rigby may refer to:

 Ray Rigby (politician) (1923–2019), American politician
 Ray Rigby (weightlifter) (1949–1998), Australian weightlifter and shot putter
 Ray Rigby (screenwriter) (1916–1995), British screenwriter